Ina Marlene King is a writer, producer and director. She is best known as the executive producer and showrunner of the Freeform teen drama series Pretty Little Liars, based on the book series of the same name by Sara Shepard.

Personal life 
She has two sons.
She grew up in Winchester, Indiana/Greenville, Ohio.

Filmography

Television

Films

Acting

References

External links 
 
 

American screenwriters
American television producers
American women television producers
American television writers
Pepperdine University alumni
American women screenwriters
American women television writers
American lesbian writers
Living people
American LGBT screenwriters
LGBT people from Indiana
Year of birth missing (living people)
21st-century American women writers